The Baitoa Formation is a geologic formation in Dominican Republic. The formation consists of siltstones and limestones deposited in a shallow marine to reef environment. The formation, unconformably overlying the Tabera Formation and unconformably overlain by the Cercado Formation, preserves bivalve, gastropod, echinoid and coral fossils dating back to the Burdigalian to Langhian period.

See also 
 List of fossiliferous stratigraphic units in the Dominican Republic
 La Toca Formation
 El Mamey Formation

References

Further reading 
 S. D. Cairns and J. W. Wells. 1987. Neogene paleontology in the northern Dominican Republic, 5. The suborders Caryophylliina and Dendrophylliina (Anthozoa, Scleractinia). Bulletins of American Paleontology 93(328):23-43
 L. Dolin. 1991. Cypraeoidea and Lamellarioidea (Mollusca: Gastropoda), from the Chipola Formation (late early Miocene) of northwestern Florida. Tulane Studies in Geology and Paleontology 24(1-2):1-60
 A. B. Foster. 1986. Neogene paleontology in the northern Dominican Republic, 3. The family Poritidae (Anthozoa, Scleractinia). Bulletins of American Paleontology 90:47-123
 J. B. Saunders, P. Jung, and B. Biju-Duval. 1986. Neogene Paleontology in the Northern Dominican Republic: 1. Field Surveys, Lithology, Environment, and Age. Bulletins of American Paleontology 89(323):1-79
 H. E. Vokes and E. H. Vokes. 1968. Variation in the genus Orthaulax (Mollusca: Gastropoda). Tulane Studies in Geology and Paleontology 6(2):71-84

Geologic formations of the Dominican Republic
Neogene Dominican Republic
Burdigalian
Langhian
Siltstone formations
Limestone formations
Shallow marine deposits
Reef deposits